To fall from grace is an idiom referring to a loss of status, respect, or prestige.

Fall from grace may also refer to:

 Fall of man, in Christianity, the transition of the very first man and woman from a state of innocent obedience to God to a state of guilty disobedience
 Fallen angel, a wicked or rebellious angel that has been cast out of Heaven

Literature
 Fall from Grace (Greeley), a novel by Andrew Greeley
 Fall from Grace (Collins), a novel by Larry Collins
 Fall From Grace: The Failed Crusade of the Christian Right,  1990 book by Michael D'Antonio
 Fall from Grace, a 2015 novel by Wayne Arthurson
 Fallen Grace, a novel by Mary Hooper

Music
 Fall from Grace (band), a punk rock band which debuted in 2004

Albums
 Fall from Grace (Death Angel album), 1990
 Fall from Grace (EP), a 1997 EP by the band Ensign
 Fallen from Grace, a 2007 album by American hip hop group Insane Poetry
 Fall from Grace (Infernal album), 2010
 Fall from Grace (Borealis album), 2011

Songs
 "Fallen from Grace", a song from the 1990 album Brigade by Heart 
 "Fall from Grace", a song from the 2013 album Searching by Jay Diggins
 "Fall from Grace", a song from the 2013 album Sequel to the Prequel by Babyshambles
 "Fallen from Grace", a song from the 1987 album Monolith by Amebix
 "Fallen from Grace", a 2008 song from MyEarthDream by Edenbridge
 "Fall from Grace", 1995 song from Amanda Marshall by Amanda Marshall
 "Fall from Grace", 2001 song from the album All in Hand by Rosemary's Sons
 "Fall from Grace", 2001 song from the Stevie Nicks album Trouble in Shangri-La
 "Fall from Grace", a song by Morbid Angel from their 1991 album Blessed Are the Sick
 "Elizabeth III: Fall from Grace", song from the album Karma by American power metal band Kamelot
 "Fall from Grace", a song from the 2002 album On a Wire by The Get Up Kids
 "Fall from Grace", a song from the 2011 album The Hymn of a Broken Man by Times of Grace
 "Falling from Grace", a song from the 1983 album A Child's Adventure by Marianne Faithfull
 "Falling from Grace, Pt. 1, Wake The Nightmares", song from the 2003 album "Soundchaser" by Rage
 "Falling from Grace, Pt. 2, Death Is On Its Way", song from the 2003 album "Soundchaser" by Rage
 "Fall from Grace", a song from album Singles by Future Islands

Film
 Fall from Grace (1990 film), a 1990 film about Jim and Tammy Faye Bakker
 Falling from Grace (film), a 1992 film starring John Mellencamp
 A Fall from Grace, a 2020 film directed by Tyler Perry

Other media
 Fall from Grace, a 1994 Daredevil story arc
 Fall-From-Grace, a character from the 1999 computer role-playing game Planescape: Torment
 "Fall From Grace", an episode in the TV series Shark
 "Fall from Grace" (House), a 2011 episode of the TV series House

See also 
 Falling from Grace (disambiguation)
 Fall to Grace (disambiguation)